The Armée d'Orient (English: Army of the Orient) was the French military force gathered by the French Directory to send on the expedition to Ottoman Egypt in 1798.  The expedition had the intention of barring Great Britain's route to its colonies in India and was put under the command of Napoleon Bonaparte.

Land forces
 Commander in chief: Général Napoléon Bonaparte
 Chef d'état-major : Général Berthier
 Numbers: 45,000 of which 33,000 in Egypt

Compagnie des guides 
 Numbers: 500 men on foot and on horseback

Division Desaix 
 Commander: Général Louis Charles Antoine Desaix
 Numbers: 5600 men
 Made up of the following regiments:
 21e demi-brigade d'infanterie légère : 3 battalions, 2100 men in total
 61e demi-brigade d'infanterie de ligne : 3 battalions, 1900 men in total
 88e demi-brigade d'infanterie de ligne : 3 battalions, 1600 men in total

Division Reynier 
 Commander: Général Reynier
 Numbers: 3450 men
 Made up of the following regiments:
 9e demi-brigade d'infanterie de ligne : 3 battalions, 1620 men in total
 85e demi-brigade d'infanterie de ligne : 3 battalions, 1840 men in total

Division Kleber 
 Commander: Jean-Baptiste Kléber
 Numbers: 4900 men
 Made up of the following regiments:
 2e demi-brigade d'infanterie légère : 3 battalions, 1450 men in total
 25e demi-brigade d'infanterie de ligne : 3 battalions, 1650 men in total
 75e demi-brigade d'infanterie de ligne : 3 battalions, 1800 men in total

Division Menou 
 Commander: Général Jacques-Francois Menou
 Numbers: 5200 men
 Made up of the following regiments:
 22e demi-brigade d'infanterie légère : 3 battalions, 1100 men in total
 13e demi-brigade d'infanterie de ligne : 3 battalions, 2500 men in total
 69e demi-brigade d'infanterie de ligne : 3 battalions, 1600 men in total

Division Bon 
 Commander: Général Louis André Bon
 Numbers: 4700 men
 Made up of the following regiments:
 4e demi-brigade d'infanterie légère : 2 battalions, 1100 men in total
 18e demi-brigade d'infanterie de ligne : 3 battalions, 1650 men in total
 32e demi-brigade d'infanterie de ligne : 3 battalions, 1950 men in total

Division Dumas (cavalry) 
 Commander: Général Dumas
 Numbers: 3050 men
 Made up of the following regiments:
 7e régiment bis de hussards : 3 squadrons, 630 men in total
 22e régiment de chasseurs à cheval : 3 squadrons, 280 men in total
 3e régiment de dragons : 2 squadrons, 390 men in total
 14e régiment de dragons : 3 squadrons, 640 men in total
 15e régiment de dragons : 2 squadrons, 230 men in total
 18e régiment de dragons : 4 squadrons, 330 men in total
 20e régiment de dragons : 3 squadrons, 530 men in total

Division Dommartin (Artillery) 
 Commander of the artillery: Général Dommartin
 Firepower: 171 artillery pieces, including:
 35 siege cannons
 24 howitzers
 40 mortars
 Numbers: 3150 men
 Split between:
 3 cavalry companies
 6 infantry companies
 3éme Compagnie du 4éme Régiment d'Artillerie à Cheval
 2éme Compagnie du 5éme Régiment d'Artillerie à Cheval
 3éme and 11éme Compagnies du 1er Régiment d'Artillerie à Pied
 1er, 2e, 6e, 7e, and 10éme Compagnies du 4éme Régiment d'Artillerie à Pied
 9 companies of demi-brigades

Division Caffarelli (engineers) 
 Commander (engineers): Général Caffarelli du Falga
 Numbers: 1200 men
 Split between:
 775 sappers
 190 miners
 165 workers
 25 balloonists

Garrison troops 
 Corsica: 3600 men of:
 23e demi-brigade d'infanterie légère: 3 battalions, totalling 2500 men
 1er bataillon de la 86e demi-brigades d'infanterie de ligne: 1 battalion, totalling 1100 men
 Malta: 8000 men
 Division Chabot: 4000 men of:
 6e demi-brigade d'infanterie de ligne: 3 battalions, totalling 1000 men
 79e demi-brigade d'infanterie de ligne: 3 battalions, totalling 3000 men
 Division Vaubois: 4000 men of
 3e bataillon de la 7e demi-brigade d'infanterie légère: 1 battalion, totalling 1150 men
 19e demi-brigade d'infanterie de ligne: 2 battalions, totalling 1050 men
 1er bataillon de la 80e demi-brigade d'infanterie de ligne: 1 battalion, totalling 550 men
 Various elements drawn from 6e and 41e demi-brigade d'infanterie de ligne as well as from 23e demi-brigade d'infanterie légère: 1200 men

Sea forces
Known as the Escadre d'Orient, the ships of the taskforce transported the land troops and at times during the campaign operated in tandem with them.
 Commanded by admiral Brueys
 Numbers: 335 boats, of which only 55 were armed

Ships of the line 

15, of which 2 were armed "en flûte"
 Flagship : L'Orient, 120 guns
 Hospital ship : Le Causse, 70 guns (captured at Venice)
 80 guns :
 Le Guillaume-Tell
 Le Franklin
 Le Tonnant
 74 guns :
 Le Spartiate
 L'Aquilon
 Le Généreux
 Le Guerrier
 Le Peuple-Souverain
 Le Timoléon
 Le Heureux
 Le Mercure
 64 guns :
 Le Conquérant
 Le Dubois (captured at Venice)

Frigates 

13 (7 armed "en flûte")
 40 guns :
 La Justice
 La Diane
 La Junon
 L'Artémise
 36 guns :
 L'Alceste
 La Sérieuse (notable for being the subject of a poem by French Romantic - Alfred de Vigny)
 La Sensible
 La Courageuse
 La Carrère
 La Muiron
 La Leoben
 30 guns :
 La Mantoue
 La Montenotte

Others 
 1 corvette, the 30 gun La Badine
 79 brigs (of which 5 were armed)
 38 bomb vessels (of which 4 were armed)
 3 avisos armés
 75 tartanes (of which 6 were armed)
 6 chaloupes-canonnières
 2 felouques canonnières
 1 schooner
 9 pinques
 82 polacres
 11 trois-mats à hunes (three-masters)

References and notes

Orient
French campaign in Egypt and Syria
Orient
Napoleonic Wars orders of battle
French Revolutionary Wars orders of battle